Marrow is an American rock band from Chicago, Illinois. The band consists of three former members of the Chicago band Kids These Days, as well as one new member.

History
After the break up of Kids These Days, Macie Stewart and Liam Kazar (Liam Cunningham) were still interested in writing music and being in a band. In 2013, along with former bandmate, Lane Beckstrom, Marrow was formed. Matt Carroll, not a member of Kids These Days, also joined the group. The band released their first EP, titled Two, in December of the same year. A single music video for both songs on the EP was also released.

On September 4, 2015, Marrow released their debut full-length album Gold Standard via Foxhall Records.   
On November 19, 2015, Impose Magazine released a new song by Marrow titled "Fool".

Beyond Marrow
Macie Stewart went on to many musical other projects in Chicago, most notably OHMME, with Matt Carroll sometimes accompanying.  Liam Kazar backed Tweedy on tour.  In 2021, Kazar released a solo album and was regularly performing in Chicago, including with his band.  Gehring, Kazar, Kazar's sister Sima Cunningham, Sullivan Davis, and Spencer Tweedy frequently join Andrew Sa's Cosmic Country Showcase band, in Chicago and Milwaukee, Wisconsin, as of 2021-2022.

Band members
Macie Stewart (vocals, keyboard, guitar)
Liam Kazar (vocals, guitar)
Dorian Gehring (bass)
Matt Carroll (drums)

Discography
Studio albums
The Gold Standard (2014, Foxhall Records)
EPs
Two (2013, self-released)

References

Indie rock musical groups from Illinois
Musical groups established in 2013
Musical groups from Chicago
2013 establishments in Illinois